Gabriel Debru (born 21 December 2005) is a French tennis player.

Debru has a career high ATP singles ranking of 539 achieved on 17 October 2022. He also has a career high ATP doubles ranking of 1073 achieved on 17 October 2022.

Debru won the 2022 French Open – Boys' singles title.

Junior Grand Slam finals

Singles: 1 (1 title)

Doubles: 1 (1 runners-up)

References

External links
 
 Profile at ITF

2005 births
Living people
Sportspeople from Grenoble
French male tennis players
French Open junior champions
Grand Slam (tennis) champions in boys' singles